Great Houghton is a village near Northampton in West Northamptonshire. The population of the civil parish at the 2011 census was 642. It lies on the edge of the large market town, on the Bedford Road (A428). The village has two pubs and a large village hall and playing fields. The village was also the home of Great Houghton School - a private day school which closed in 2014.

The villages name means 'hill-spur farm/settlement'.

The village was struck by an F1/T2 tornado on 23 November 1981, as part of the record-breaking nationwide tornado outbreak on that day.

References

Villages in Northamptonshire
West Northamptonshire District
Civil parishes in Northamptonshire